The Brewers Cup was a Junior C ice hockey tournament hosted by Hockey Regina and the Saskatchewan Junior C Hockey League. The winner decided the Western Canada Junior "C" champion.

The tournament ran from 1992 until 2014.

Leagues
Leagues that sent competitors to the event.
Calgary Junior C Hockey League
Manitoba Major Junior Hockey League
Noralta Junior Hockey League
Qu'Appelle Valley Hockey League
Thunder Bay Junior B Hockey League

Champions

References

External links
Hockey Regina

Ice hockey tournaments in Canada
Ice hockey in Saskatchewan
Canadian ice hockey trophies and awards